The Stewart–Walker lemma provides necessary and sufficient conditions for the linear perturbation of a tensor field to be gauge-invariant.  if and only if one of the following holds

1. 

2.  is a constant scalar field 

3.  is a linear combination of products of delta functions

Derivation 

These manifolds can be put together to form a 5-manifold . This also defines a pull back  that maps a tensor field  back onto . Given sufficient smoothness a Taylor expansion can be defined

Therefore the differences in gauge become . Picking a chart where  and  then  which is a well defined vector in any  and gives the result

The only three possible ways this can be satisfied are those of the lemma.

Sources 

   Describes derivation of result in section on Lie derivatives

Tensors
Lemmas in analysis